Baykal is a rural locality (a settlement) in Pogranichny District of Primorsky Krai, Russia.

Rural localities in Primorsky Krai